Fitch is an unincorporated community in Caswell County, North Carolina, United States. It is located north of Jericho.

References

Unincorporated communities in Caswell County, North Carolina
Unincorporated communities in North Carolina